Gilles I. Pisier (born 18 November 1950) is a professor of mathematics at the Pierre and Marie Curie University and a distinguished professor and A.G. and M.E. Owen Chair of Mathematics at the Texas A&M University. He is known for his contributions to several fields of mathematics, including functional analysis, probability theory, harmonic analysis, and operator theory. He has also made fundamental contributions to the theory of  C*-algebras. Gilles is the younger brother of French actress Marie-France Pisier.

Research
Pisier has obtained many fundamental results in various parts of mathematical analysis.

Geometry of Banach spaces

In the "local theory of Banach spaces", Pisier and Bernard Maurey developed the theory of Rademacher type, following its use in probability theory by J. Hoffman–Jorgensen and in the characterization of Hilbert spaces among Banach spaces by S. Kwapień. Using probability in vector spaces, Pisier proved that super-reflexive Banach spaces can be renormed with the modulus of uniform convexity having "power type". His work (with Per Enflo and Joram Lindenstrauss) on the "three–space problem" influenced the work on quasi–normed spaces by Nigel Kalton.

Operator theory

Pisier transformed the area of operator spaces. In the 1990s, he solved two long-standing open problems. In the theory of C*-algebras, he solved, jointly with Marius Junge, the problem of the uniqueness of C* -norms on the tensor product of two copies of B(H), the bounded linear operators on a Hilbert space H. He and Junge were able to produce two such tensor norms that are nonequivalent. In 1997, he constructed an operator that was polynomially bounded but not similar to a contraction, answering a famous question of Paul Halmos.

Awards
He was an invited speaker at the 1983 ICM and 
a plenary speaker at the 1998 ICM. In 1997, Pisier received the Ostrowski Prize for this work. He is also a recipient of the Grands Prix de l'Académie des Sciences de Paris in 1992 and the Salem Prize in 1979. In 2012 he became a fellow of the American Mathematical Society.

Books
Pisier has authored several books and monographs in the fields of functional analysis, harmonic analysis, and operator theory. Among them are:

References

External links

1950 births
Living people
20th-century French mathematicians
21st-century French mathematicians
Academic staff of the University of Paris
École Polytechnique alumni
Members of the French Academy of Sciences
Texas A&M University faculty
Fellows of the American Mathematical Society
Foreign Fellows of the Indian National Science Academy